Gopal S

ingh Rawat (died 22 September 2020) was an Officer on Special Duty to Uttarakhand Chief Minister Trivendra Singh Rawat.

He died on 22 September 2020, from COVID-19 during the COVID-19 pandemic in India at the hospital of All India Institute of Medical Sciences, Rishikesh. He had been hospitalized for nearly three weeks.

References 

Year of birth missing
Place of birth missing
2020 deaths
Deaths from the COVID-19 pandemic in India
Indian civil servants